Levko "Lev" Mykolajovych Revutskyi (– 30 March 1977) was a Ukrainian composer, teacher, and activist. Amongst his students at the Lysenko Music Institute were the composers Arkady Filippenko and Valentin Silvestrov.

Biography

Early life and education
The parents of the future composer were well-educated. His music talent showed up very early and his mother began to teach young Revutsky to play the piano when he hardly was five years old. By age ten, he showed skill at improvisation and had perfect pitch, earning him the nickname "Tuning fork".

In 1903 his parents transferred Revutsky to Kiev's Val'ker gymnasium and simultaneously the music school of Mykola Tumanovsky where he studied fortepiano with Mykola Lysenko. Revutsky later recalled, "Lysenko became for me the first example of artistic ideals."

Graduating from the gymnasium in 1907, he entered the physic-mathematics faculty of Kiev University. In 1908, Revutsky also entered law school and at the same time renewed piano classes at the Kiev music college run by the Russian Music Society. He was greatly impressed by visits to Moscow and St. Petersburg where he attended the theatre and concerts.

In three years of studies in the premiere course of the school Revutsky had considerable successes. In 1911 he graduated to the higher level in the class of G. Hodorovsky. Revutsky's studies in the class of this master lasted a few years: from 1911 to 1913 year in musical school, and afterwards in the newly opened Kiev conservatory. In the conservatory, Revutsky simultaneously with his piano studies begins to visit Gliere's composition classes. He continued his university studies.

The first part of piano sonata (in C minor), sketches for the first symphony, and the prelude of opus four were created at this time. Revutsky graduated from both the university and conservatory in 1916, and went to fight in the First World War.

Post graduate work
Demobilized in 1918, Revutsky moved to Pryluky. In 1924 Revutsky was invited to Kiev to work as a teacher at the Lysenko Music-Drama Institute. From this time he gave himself to pedagogical work, initially as teacher, and then as professor of music-theory and performance and composition .

In the 1930s Revutsky had considerable achievements as a composer. In addition, he created his music-pedagogical systems. For hismerits in the field of culture Revutsky received the title of People's Artist of Ukraine in 1942, and in 1944 People's Artist of USSR. In the post-war period he participated in a renewal of artistic-cultural life of the Republic. From 1944 to 1948 he headed the Composers Union of Ukraine. Revutsky was also elected by the deputy of Supreme Soviet of Ukraine to a number of convocations.

In 1950 he undertook the enormous task of editing and preparing Mykola Lysenko's works for publication. In February, 1969 in connection with his 80th birthday and for creative merit Levko Revutsky was awarded the title of Hero of Socialist Labor. He died on 30 March 1977 in Kiev, and is buried in Baikove Cemetery.

Legacy
The creative legacy of Levko Revutsky is celebrated in his native Ukraine, where his contributions to vocal and orchestral music are considered a crucial part of its musical heritage. According to Irene Rima Makaryk and Virlana Tkacz, Revutsky continued and developed the aesthetic principles of Lysenko and Mykola Leontovych.

Many of his works—including the Symphony No. 2 and Piano Concerto—are considered to be the first mature exemplars of Ukrainian compositions in various genres. Revutsky also made important contribution to the development in Ukraine of folk song arrangements; he composed approximately 120 altogether.

Outside of Ukraine, Revutsky's reception has been more muted. Marina Frolova-Walker described his Symphony No. 2 as being "post-Kuchka" stylistically:

[It is] quite accomplished and attractive, if lacking in originality. It had largely been composed in the mid-1920s, but it was revised for performance in 1940 (and sounded as if it had been written in the 1890s).

In the deliberations preceding the nominations for the 1941 Stalin Prize, the original nomination of Sergei Prokofiev's Alexander Nevsky was dropped in favor of Revutsky's Symphony No. 2.

Sonechko regional child creative activity holiday is sited at Revutsky homestead in Irzhavets of Ichnia district.

Quotes

 "I attach serious significance to the ethics-moral face of an artist…  I do not separate aesthetics from ethics." — Revutsky
 "Levko Mykolaevich Revutsky is for sure one of the most prominent figures at the musical front of Soviet Ukraine… The creative prosecution of the richest song material of Ukraine exposed Revutsky as a large master, whose taste provided him into treatments of high artistic level and mass fully deserved popularity, which goes out far outside Ukraine…" — Borys Lyatoshynsky

Honours and awards
 Honoured Artist of the Ukrainian SSR (1941)
 Hero of Socialist Labour (24 February 1969)
 Four Orders of Lenin (20 February 1949, 1953, 27 October 1967, 24 February 1969)
 Order of the Red Banner of Labour, four times (17 April 1938, 23 January 1948, 30 June 1951, 24 November 1960)
 Stalin Prize, second class (1941) - for symphony number 2
 Shevchenko National Prize (1966)
 People's Artist of the USSR (1944)

Works

Orchestral
Symphony No. 1 in A major opus 3 (1916–1921, revised 1957)
Symphony No. 2 in E major opus 12 (1926–1927, revised 1940 and 1970)
Kozachok (Ukrainian folk dance) for orchestra (1929)
Piano Concerto in F major (1929)
Piano Concerto No. 2 in F major, Op. 18 (1934)

Piano
Piano Sonata Allegro in B minor opus 1 (1912)
Three Preludes for piano opus 4 (1914)
Seven Preludes for piano opus 7
Seven Preludes for piano opus 11 (1924)
Two Pieces for piano opus 17 (1929)

Vocal works
"The Whole Year" for soloists, chorus and piano (lyrics by Oleksandr Oles) opus 5 (1923)
Khustyna, cantata (lyrics T. Shevchenko) for soloists, chorus and piano (1923)
Sonechko, folksong-arrangements for voice and piano (1925)
Cossack-Songs, folksong-arrangements for voice and piano (1926)
Galician Songs, folksong-arrangements for voice and piano opus 14 (1926–1927)
Monologue of Taras Bulba for bass and orchestra (lyrics by Maksym Rylsky) (1936)
Festive Song for chorus and orchestra (Lyrics M. Rylsky) (1949)
Song-Ode, vocal-symphonic poem (1957)

Orchestrations
Orchestration (re-arrangement and editing of opera and additional composition of overture) of Mykola Lysenko's opera Taras Bulba (with Borys Liatoshynsky)
Piano concerto by Viktor Kosenko

Chamber music
Intermezzo for violin and piano
Sonata for cello
ballade for cello and piano (1933)
incidental music
film music

See also
List of Ukrainian composers - see other Ukrainian composers of the same period
Symphony No. 2 (Revutsky)

Notes

References
Dytyniak Maria  Ukrainian Composers - A Bio-bibliographic Guide - Research report No. 14, 1896, Canadian Institute of Ukrainian Studies, University of Alberta, Canada.
 Collected works in 11 volumes K. 1981-1988

Revutsky,Levko
Revutsky,Levko
People from Chernihiv Oblast
People from Priluksky Uyezd
Russian military personnel of World War I
Ukrainian people of World War I
Second convocation members of the Verkhovna Rada of the Ukrainian Soviet Socialist Republic
Third convocation members of the Verkhovna Rada of the Ukrainian Soviet Socialist Republic
Fourth convocation members of the Verkhovna Rada of the Ukrainian Soviet Socialist Republic
Fifth convocation members of the Verkhovna Rada of the Ukrainian Soviet Socialist Republic
Ukrainian classical composers
Ukrainian music educators
Academic staff of Kyiv Conservatory
Members of the National Academy of Sciences of Ukraine
Heroes of Socialist Labour
Recipients of the Order of Lenin
Stalin Prize winners
Recipients of the Shevchenko National Prize
People's Artists of the USSR
Burials at Baikove Cemetery